The 1941–42 season of Division 2 was the second tier of ice hockey in Sweden for that season.  The league was divided into three groups—north, central, and south (norra, centrala and södra)— each containing six teams.  The winning team from each group played a promotion which resulted in IFK Mariefred and UoIF Matteuspojkarna qualifying for play in the Svenska Serien for the 1942–43 season.

Final standings

Northern group (Division 2 norra)

Central group (Division 2 centrala)

Southern group (Division 2 södra)

See also
1941–42 Svenska Serien season
1942 Swedish Ice Hockey Championship

References

Division 2 (Swedish ice hockey) seasons
2